"Battle Cry" is a song by American rock band Imagine Dragons. It was released on June 2, 2014 as a single promoting Transformers: Age of Extinction, a 2014 science fiction action film based on the Transformers franchise. The song was also included on the band’s second studio album, Smoke + Mirrors. It is the first theme song in the live-action Transformers film franchise not to be performed by Linkin Park, though the latter's "Until It's Gone" is included on the accompanying video game.

Background
As part of his efforts to distance Age of Extinction from the previous films in the series, Transformers director Michael Bay sought out a new musical act to soundtrack the film and hand picked Imagine Dragons for the job. "Battle Cry" was written by the group members specifically for use in the film, inspired by the story as pitched to them by Bay. Lead singer Dan Reynolds revealed to Billboard that the aim with "Battle Cry" was to write "in a more cinematic way" to compose a song that was satisfying as a piece of music but also benefited the visual it was set to accompany.

Track listing

Personnel
Imagine Dragons
Dan Reynolds – vocals, piano
Wayne Sermon – acoustic and electric guitars
Ben McKee – bass guitar, keyboards
Daniel Platzman – drums, percussion

Additional Musicians
Hans Zimmer – production
Steve Jablonsky – production

Charts

Weekly charts

Certifications

References

Imagine Dragons songs
Rock ballads
2014 songs
Interscope Records singles
Universal Music Group singles
2014 singles
Songs written by Wayne Sermon
Songs written by Dan Reynolds (musician)
Songs written by Daniel Platzman
Songs written by Ben McKee
2010s ballads
Songs from Transformers (film series)
Symphonic rock songs
Electronic rock songs